Francisco Torr (born 8 March 1931) known as Pires, is a former Portuguese footballer who played as a defender.

External links 
 
 

1931 births
Living people
Portuguese footballers
Association football defenders
Primeira Liga players
C.F. Os Belenenses players
Portugal international footballers